There are at least 314 named mountains in Flathead County, Montana.
 Marmot Mountain, el. 
 Masonry Peak, el. 
 McGregor Peak, el. 
 McPartland Mountain, el. 
 Meadow Mountain, el. 
 Meadow Peak, el. 
 Medicine Grizzly Peak, el. 
 Mid Mountain, el. 
 Minaret Peak, el. 
 Moccasin Butte, el. 
 Moose Peak, el. 
 Moran Peak, el. 
 Mount Adams, el. 
 Mount Aeneas, el. 
 Mount Baptiste, el. 
 Mount Bradley, el. 
 Mount Brown, el. 
 Mount Cameahwait, el. 
 Mount Cannon, el. 
 Mount Carter, el. 
 Mount Custer, el. 
 Mount Despair, el. 
 Mount Doody, el. 
 Mount Furlong, el. 
 Mount Geduhn, el. 
 Mount Grant, el. 
 Mount Hefty, el. 
 Mount Jackson, el. 
 Mount Johns, el. 
 Mount Liebig, el. 
 Mount May, el. 
 Mount Murray, el. 
 Mount Oberlin, el. 
 Mount Orvis Evans, el. 
 Mount Peabody, el. 
 Mount Penrose, el. 
 Mount Phillips, el. 
 Mount Pinchot, el. 
 Mount Rockwell, el. 
 Mount Saint Nicholas, el. 
 Mount Shields, el. 
 Mount Stimson, el. 
 Mount Swaney, el. 
 Mount Thompson, el. 
 Mount Thompson-Seton, el. 
 Mount Vaught, el. 
 Mount Young, el. 
 Mud Lake Mountain, el. 
 Murr Peak, el. 
 Nahsukin Mountain, el. 
 Nasukoin Mountain, el. 
 Norris Mountain, el. 
 Numa Peak, el. 
 Nyack Mountain, el. 
 Oreamnos Peak, el. 
 Ousel Peak, el. 
 Owl Peak, el. 
 Pagoda Mountain, el. 
 Parke Peak, el. 
 Paul Bunyans Cabin, el. 
 Paul Mountain, el. 
 Pentagon Mountain, el. 
 Peril Peak, el. 
 Pilot Knob, el. 
 Pinehill, el. 
 Pivot Mountain, el. 
 Pleasant Valley Mountain, el. 
 Pot Mountain, el. 
 Prospector Mountain, el. 
 Puzzle Hills, el. 
 Pyramid Peak, el. 
 Rainbow Peak, el. 
 Rampage Mountain, el. 
 Rampart Mountain, el. 
 Razoredge Mountain, el. 
 Red Crow Mountain, el. 
 Red Plume Mountain, el. 
 Red Sky Mountain, el. 
 Reuter Peak, el. 
 Ringer Mountain, el. 
 Riverview Mountain, el. 
 Rogers Peak, el. 
 Running Rabbit Mountain, el. 
 Salmon Point, el. 
 Salt Mountain, el. 
 Salvage Mountain, el. 
 Sanders Mountain, el. 
 Sarah Peak, el. 
 Scalplock Mountain, el. 
 Sergeant Mountain, el. 
 Shadow Mountain, el. 
 Sheep Mountain, el. 
 Sheepherder Hill, el. 
 Silvertip Mountain, el. 
 Sixmile Mountain, el. 
 Skeleton Mountain, el. 
 Slick Rock, el. 
 Slideout Peak, el. 
 Slippery Bill Mountain, el. 
 Snow Peak, el. 
 Snowshed Mountain, el. 
 Snowslip Mountain, el. 
 Soakem Mountain, el. 
 Soldier Mountain, el. 
 Soldier Mountain, el. 
 Solitude Point, el. 
 Sphinx Peak, el. 
 Spotted Bear Mountain, el. 
 Spruce Point, el. 
 Spy Mountain, el. 
 Square Mountain, el. 
 Square Peak, el. 
 Stadium Peak, el. 
 Standard Peak, el. 
 Stanton Mountain, el. 
 Statuary Mountain, el. 
 Stony Hill, el. 
 Strawberry Mountain, el. 
 Sunday Mountain, el. 
 Swanberg Mountain, el. 
 Table Hill, el. 
 Table Mountain, el. 
 Tally Mountain, el. 
 Teakettle Mountain, el. 
 Tent Mountain, el. 
 Tepee Mountain, el. 
 Three Eagles Mountain, el. 
 Threesuns Mountain, el. 
 Threetops Mountain, el. 
 Thunderbolt Mountain, el. 
 Tinkham Mountain, el. 
 Tom Tom Mountain, el. 
 Tongue Mountain, el. 
 Tranquil Mountain, el. 
 Trapper Peak, el. 
 Triangle Peak, el. 
 Trilobite Peak, el. 
 Trinity Mountain, el. 
 Triple Divide Peak, el. 
 Tuchuck Mountain, el. 
 Turtlehead Mountain, el. 
 Twin Mountain, el. 
 Unawah Mountain, el. 
 Union Mountain, el. 
 Vance Hill, el. 
 Vigil Peak, el. 
 Vinegar Mountain, el. 
 Vulture Peak, el. 
 Walton Mountain, el. 
 Warrior Mountain, el. 
 Wedge Mountain, el. 
 Werner Peak, el. 
 Whale Buttes, el. 
 Whitcomb Peak, el. 
 Whitefish Mountain, el. 
 Wickiup Mountain, el. 
 Wild Bill Mountain, el. 
 Wild Horse Mountain, el. 
 Wildcat Mountain, el. 
 Wildrose Mountain, el. 
 Winter Points, el. 
 Wolf Gun Mountain, el. 
 Wolftail Mountain, el. *

See also
 List of mountains in Montana
 List of mountain ranges in Montana

Notes

FlatheadM-Z